Banggai Laut Regency is a regency in the province of Central Sulawesi, Indonesia. The regency was established on 14 December 2012, partitioned from the Banggai Islands Regency. It comprises the main island of Banggai itself (including 40 offshore islets), the islands of Labobo and Bangkurung to the southwest of Banggai Island, and the numerous small Bokan Islands (Kepulauan Bokan) to the southeast. It covers a land area of 725.67 km2, and had a population of 70,435 at the 2020 Census; the official estimate as at mid 2021 was 70,872.

Administration 
The new Banggai Laut Regency is composed of seven districts (kecamatan), tabulated below with their areas and their 2010 Census  and 2020 Census populations, together with the official estimates as at mid 2021. The table also includes the location of the district headquarters, the number of administrative villages in each district (in total, 63 rural desa and 3 urban kelurahan), and its postal codes.

Notes: (a) including three kelurahan - Dodung, Lompio, and Tano Bonunungan. (b) including 10 small offshore islands. (c) including 42 small offshore islands. (d) comprising 91 islands.

Climate
Banggai has a tropical rainforest climate (Af) with moderate rainfall from September to December and heavy to very heavy rainfall from January to August.

References